The 2016 Copa do Brasil Second Round will be played from 3 May to 6 July 2016, to decide the 20 teams advancing to the Third Round.

Matches

|}

Match 41

Santos advanced directly due to winning by 2 or more goals difference.

Match 42

Tied 2–2 on aggregate, Gama won on penalties.

Match 43

Botafogo won 2–0 on aggregate

Match 44

Ceará won 2–0 on aggregate.

Match 45

Vasco da Gama won 2–1 on aggregate.

Match 46

Santa Cruz advanced directly due to winning by 2 or more goals difference.

Match 47

Cruzeiro advanced directly due to winning by 2 or more goals difference.

Match 48

Vitória won 3–1 on aggregate.

Match 49

Juventude won 3–2 on aggregate.

Match 50

Paysandu won 2–1 on aggregate.

Match 51

Atlético Paranaense won 7–2 on aggregate.

Match 52

Chapecoense won 3–2 on aggregate.

Match 53

Fortaleza won 4–2 on aggregate.

Match 54

América Mineiro won 1–0 on aggregate.

Match 55

Fluminense won 6–3 on aggregate.

Match 56

Ypiranga won 4–3 on aggregate.

Match 57

Figueirense won 3–1 on aggregate.

Match 58

Ponte Preta won 4–0 on aggregate.

Match 59

Botafogo won 3–1 on aggregate.

Match 60

Bragantino won 2–1 on aggregate.

References

2016 Copa do Brasil